Fortuna Lake is a 2019 Colombian film directed and co-written by Felipe Martínez Amador.

Plot 
Malorie escapes from a psychiatric hospital. She doesn't remember why she ended up in that place. Malorie arrives in Fortuna Lake, where she meets Jared, a mysterious neighbor. Together with him, she will try to recover some of the clarity she has lost in recent weeks, to escape those who are stalking her, to understand the dark hallucinations that torment her and to discover the relationship they have with Susan's disappearance.

Cast
Estefanía Piñeres - Malorie McCoy
José Restrepo - Jared Fink
Daniela Martínez - Danny Dodge
Carolina Cuervo - The nurse

References

External links 

Colombian horror films
2010s Spanish-language films
2019 films
2019 horror films